Tamar Estine Braxton (born March 17, 1977) is an American singer and television personality.

Braxton began her career in 1990 as a founding member of The Braxtons, an R&B singing group formed with her sisters. The Braxtons released their debut album, So Many Ways, as a trio in 1996, and disbanded shortly afterward. In 2000, she released her debut self-titled album through DreamWorks Records. Following a thirteen-year break, Braxton released her second studio album, Love and War (2013), through Epic Records, which reached the number two position on the Billboard 200 chart. She later released her fourth and fifth albums, Calling All Lovers (2015) and Bluebird of Happiness (2017), respectively. Braxton has won a BET Award and three Soul Train Music Awards throughout her career. She has also been nominated for four Grammy Awards.

Since 2011, Braxton has starred in the We TV reality television series Braxton Family Values alongside her mother and sisters. She also served as a co-host on the Fox syndicated daytime talk show The Real from 2013 until 2016, for which she received two Daytime Emmy Award nominations. In 2019, she won the second season of Celebrity Big Brother.

Life and career

1977–1999: Early life and career beginnings
Tamar Estine Braxton was born to Michael and Evelyn Braxton in Severn, Maryland on March 17, 1977. The youngest of the Braxtons' six children, Braxton started singing as a toddler. The Braxton children would eventually enter in their church choir, where their father Michael Braxton was a pastor. She and her sisters Toni, Traci, Towanda, and Trina, signed their first record deal with Arista Records in 1989. In 1990, they released their first single, "Good Life", which peaked at No. 79 on the Billboard Hot R&B/Hip-Hop Singles chart. At the time of the single's release, the members' age differences created a problem with marketing. Subsequently, The Braxtons were dropped from Arista Records.

In 1991, during a showcase with L.A. Reid and Kenneth "Babyface" Edmonds, who were in the process of forming LaFace Records, Toni Braxton, minus her four sisters, was chosen and signed as the label's first female solo artist. At the time, the remaining members were told that LaFace was not looking for another girl group since it had just signed TLC. After Toni's departure from the group, the remaining Braxtons members became backup singers for Toni's first tour, music videos, and promotional appearances. She and her sisters Traci, Towanda, and Trina were featured in the music video for Toni Braxton's third single, "Seven Whole Days", from her self-titled debut album.

In 1993, LaFace Records A&R Vice President, Bryant Reid, signed The Braxtons to LaFace. However, the group never released an album or single for the label. When Reid moved on to work for Atlantic Records, he convinced executives at LaFace to allow him to take the group to Atlantic also. It was reported in Vibe magazine that in 1995, Traci Braxton had left the group to pursue a career as a youth counselor. However, it was not confirmed until a 2011 promotional appearance on The Mo'Nique Show, that Traci was not allowed to sign with Atlantic because of her pregnancy at the time.

In 1996, Tamar, Trina, and Towanda returned with a new album entitled So Many Ways, which peaked at No. 26 on the Billboard R&B/Hip-Hop Albums chart. At the time of its release, Reid told Billboard magazine, "I had a vision for them then that was about young sophistication with sex appeal." The trio also performed a remixed version of "So Many Ways" with rapper Jay-Z on September 9, 1996 at the Soul Train Lady of Soul Awards. So Many Ways went on to peak at No. 83 on the Billboard Hot 100 chart and number 32 on the UK Singles Chart. Braxton and her fellow group members served as the opening act for Toni Braxton on the European Leg of her Secrets Tour in 1997. The Braxtons decided to part ways as a group after Braxton left to pursue a solo career with DreamWorks Records in 1998.

2000–2009: Tamar and label troubles
Later, Braxton met Christopher "Tricky" Stewart. She recorded her solo debut album, Ridiculous, so-named for the many different musical styles on the album. The album spawned two buzz singles ("Let Him Go" and "Just Cuz") in hopes of garnering attention from the public eye; however, when the songs failed to gain impact on urban radio outlets, the album was pushed back and canceled. That same year, Braxton was featured on Sole's, "4 The Love of You." Instead of shelving the album, Dreamworks Records abandoned 3 old tracks, added new ones, and renamed it Tamar. The lead single "Get None" was produced by Jermaine "J.D." Dupri and also featured rap verses from him as well as former Jay-Z protégée Amil. The song also included uncredited background vocals and songwriting by R&B singer Mýa. As soon as the song began to pick up airplay, Braxton announced the album would be released in early 2000, alongside a second single, "If You Don't Wanna Love Me". The album featured production from Missy Elliott, Tim & Bob, and Tricky Stewart, but still peaked at number 127 on the Billboard 200. When the album's second single failed to gain significant radio airplay, her label dropped her from their roster.
 
In 2001, Braxton's previously unreleased song "Try Me" appeared on the soundtrack album for the film Kingdom Come. She also began to work alongside her sister Toni Braxton in a number of songs and music video cameos, including the video for "He Wasn't Man Enough." She performed, co-wrote and sang background vocals on songs for Toni's albums, The Heat (2000), Snowflakes (2001), More than a Woman (2002), Libra (2005) and Pulse (2010). When her sister launched her Las Vegas revue Toni Braxton: Revealed, Braxton again sang backup until she was replaced by singer Sparkle.

By 2004, Braxton was signed to Tommy Mottola's reactivated Casablanca Records and began work on her second album. A "Grindin'"-influenced single, "I'm Leaving," was released with a guest appearance from Bump J. alongside promotional remixes featuring Sheek Louch, Styles P. and Ali Vegas.

2010–2013: Television debut and Love and War

In 2010, Braxton signed to Universal Records, where she released a single "The Heart In Me" in July of that year which was included on the Adidas 2: The Music compilation. Her momentum with Universal would not rise to a satisfactory level to launch a second album. In January 2010, We TV confirmed that it had signed Braxton and her mother and sisters for a reality television series titled Braxton Family Values. The show premiered on April 12, 2011. On December 15, 2011, it was confirmed that Braxton and her husband Vincent would star in their own reality series centered on her solo career and their married life. In November 2011, Braxton performed "Love Overboard" at the 2011 Soul Train Awards for Lifetime Achievement recipient Gladys Knight. In September 2012, news broke that Braxton had inked a fresh recording contract with Streamline Records, an imprint of Interscope Records founded by Vincent. Later that month, her reality television show Tamar & Vince premiered on We TV.

Braxton was the featured model for the "Front Row Couture" collection during the "ELLE/Style360" NYC Fashion Week event. Braxton was a co-host of Tameka Cottle's late night talk show, Tiny Tonight, on VH1. Basketball Wives star Tami Roman became a co-host after Braxton. Later, she hosted The Culturelist, a show on BET's sister channel Centric. Former Destiny's Child member LeToya Luckett became the host after her. Braxton announced she was pregnant with her first child on March 13, 2013, during an interview on Good Morning America promoting the new season of Braxton Family Values. She gave birth to a son, Logan Vincent Herbert, on June 6, 2013.

In March 2013, it was revealed that Braxton had signed to Epic Records ahead of the release of her second album, Love and War. The album's lead single, the title track, was released on December 6, 2012. The song was a commercial success, spending 9 weeks at #1 on the Adult R&B Songs chart. Although the single reached number one on the US iTunes chart, it peaked at number 57 on the Billboard Hot 100 and number 13 on the Hot R&B/Hip-Hop Songs chart.
Braxton released "The One" as the second single from Love and War on May 7, 2013; it peaked at number 34 on the Hot R&B/Hip-Hop Songs chart. The third single, "All the Way Home," was released August 21, 2013; it peaked at number 96 on the Billboard Hot 100 and number 37 on the Hot R&B/Hip-Hop Songs chart. The song was followed by the release of Love and War on September 3, 2013. The album was a commercial success in the United States, selling 114,000 copies in its opening week, and debuting at number two on the Billboard 200 and number one on the Top R&B/Hip-Hop Albums chart. Outside the US, it debuted at number 34 on the UK R&B Albums Chart.

In 2013, Braxton became a co-host of the syndicated daytime talk show The Real alongside Adrienne Bailon, Loni Love, Jeannie Mai, and Tamera Mowry, which premiered on July 15, 2013. The second season of Tamar & Vince premiered on September 5, 2013. The second season is centered on the preparation and birth of the couple's baby, and her launch of Love and War. Braxton's special Listen Up: Tamar Braxton premiered on Centric in September 2013. Braxton's first Christmas album, Winter Loversland, was released on November 11, 2013; it debuted at number 43 on the Billboard 200 with 8,000 copies sold in its first week. In December 2013, Braxton received three nominations for the 56th Annual Grammy Awards; Best Urban Contemporary Album for Love and War, and Best R&B Song and Best R&B Performance for its title track.

2014–2018: Studio albums and Dancing with the Stars
On February 25, 2014, the remix of Robin Thicke's single "For the Rest of My Life" which features Braxton, was released as a digital single. Season 3 of Tamar & Vince premiered in October 2014, and it consisted of 10 episodes just like the previous seasons. On October 6, Braxton's new single "Let Me Know" featuring rapper Future peaked at #2 on the Billboard Trending 140 chart, less than an hour after its premiere on Braxton's official SoundCloud account and eventually reached #1 by 12:00 AM October 7. Billboard.com gave the song 4 out of 5 stars in its review of "The Best and Worst Singles of the Week" for the second week of October.

On May 27, 2015, the single "If I Don't Have You" was released. The song peaked at number 6 on the US Adult R&B Songs chart. Braxton's new album, Calling All Lovers, was released on October 2, 2015. The album peaked at number two on the US Top R&B/Hip-Hop Albums. On September 2, 2015, she was revealed as one of the celebrities who would be competing on the 21st season of Dancing with the Stars. She was paired with reigning champion, Valentin Chmerkovskiy. On November 11, Braxton revealed that she would have to withdraw from the competition due to health problems. Braxton and Chmerkovskiy finished in fifth place overall.

In October 2015, the group The Braxtons, including all five Braxton sisters, released a holiday album titled Braxton Family Christmas. On November 21, Braxton Family Christmas debuted at number 27 on the US Billboard R&B/Hip-Hop Albums, number 10 on the US R&B Chart and number 12 on US Top Holiday Albums on November 21, 2015. The album charted at number 4 on the US Heatseekers Albums on December 12, 2015. On December 7, 2015, Braxton received one Grammy nomination for "If I Don't Have You" at the 58th Annual Grammy Awards; Best R&B Performance from her latest album titled Calling All Lovers.

In May 2016, Braxton departed from The Real. The following month, it was announced on The Steve Harvey Morning Show that Steve Harvey had signed Braxton to produce her own talk show and television series with East 112th Street Productions. In April 2017, it was announced that Braxton left Epic Records to sign with Entertainment One for a $1 million deal with the label. On April 27, 2017, Braxton released "My Man" from her fifth album, Bluebird of Happiness. The song peaked at number three on the US Adult R&B Songs Billboard. Bluebird of Happiness was released on September 29, 2017, through Logan Land Records and Entertainment One, with "Blind" released as its second single. The album reached the top of the Billboard independent chart.

On March 23, 2018, Braxton and sister Towanda guest starred on their sister Toni's music video "Long as I Live". In the same year, she appeared on Hip Hop Squares. On March 28, 2018, Braxton was featured on the Todrick Hall title "National Anthem", from his album Forbidden. That same year, Braxton co-starred in the stage play Redemption of a Dogg opposite Snoop Dogg. In Parallel, she was featured on the song "Lions And Tigers And Bears", from the Todrick Hall musical Straight Outta Oz.

2019–2022: Television ventures
In 2019, Braxton appeared as a contestant in the second season of the American reality television series Celebrity Big Brother. The show premiered on CBS on January 21, 2019 and concluded on February 13, 2019. She went on to win the competition and become the first African-American person to win a season of Big Brother in the United States. In Big Brother tradition, Braxton appeared on the American television soap opera The Bold and the Beautiful, portraying a character named Chef Chambre. She taped her episode on February 20, 2019. The episode aired on Friday, March 29, 2019.

Braxton starred in the film True To The Game 2 alongside Vivica A. Fox, which premiered on April 10, 2020. In support of the film, she released a new song titled "Crazy Kind of Love", produced by Hitmaka, which was officially released on March 20, 2020. In April 2020, it was announced that Braxton would be hosting a reality television series for VH1 entitled To Catch A Beautician; the series premiered in June. In July, Braxton and We TV parted ways, with the network stating that it "will work with her representatives to honor her request to end all future work for the network." Braxton's podcast, Under Construction w/ Tamar Braxton, premiered on streaming services in November 2020, and was nomintated at the 53rd NAACP Image Awards for Outstanding Lifestyle/Self-Help Podcast.
The We TV docuseries Tamar Braxton: Get Ya Life!, in which she starred, premiered in September 2020. Braxton has since then been featured on several songs for other artists such as, Mr.P and Elijah Blake. She also announced in early 2021 that she has started back recording music (after announcing retirement in 2017) and would be releasing two albums back to back, with the first slated for release in early 2022.

2023–Present: Music Comeback
On March 17, 2023, Braxton released her comeback R&B single “Changed”. Sampling SWV’s “Rain”.

Artistry
Braxton possesses a five-octave soprano vocal range. She lists Mariah Carey, Whitney Houston, Diana Ross, Kim Burrell, and her eldest sister, Toni, as some of her influences.

Personal life
Braxton is the youngest of her siblings including her sisters Toni, Traci, Towanda, and Trina, as well as her only brother Michael, Jr. On an episode of The Real, she revealed that she suffered from vitiligo. In November 2015, she discovered that she had several pulmonary emboli in her lungs, which forced her to withdraw from her work on Dancing with the Stars. During an interview in October 2020, Braxton stated that she had been diagnosed with anxiety and depression.

In 2001, Braxton was married to her first husband, music producer Darrell "Delite" Allamby. Allamby was a songwriter and producer who worked with his frequent songwriting partner Lincoln "Link" Browder, as well as Silk, Busta Rhymes and Gerald Levert. The two met while Allamby worked on her 2000 debut album's tracks "Money Can't Buy Me Love" and "Once Again". The couple divorced in 2003 after two years of marriage.

In 2003, Braxton began dating Vincent Herbert, a record executive whom she met through her sister, Toni. The couple married on November 27, 2008. Braxton gave birth to the couple's first child, a son named Logan Vincent, in 2013. In October 2017, Braxton filed for divorce from Herbert, citing "irreconcilable differences" and seeking joint custody of their son. Their divorce was finalized in July 2019.

Braxton was in a relationship with financial adviser David Adefeso. On July 16, 2020, Braxton was hospitalized following a suicide attempt. In September 2020, Adefeso filed a restraining order against Braxton for domestic violence.

Discography

Studio albums 
 Tamar (2000)
 Love and War (2013)
 Winter Loversland (2013)
 Calling All Lovers (2015)
 Bluebird of Happiness (2017)

Filmography

Tours
Headlining
2014: Love and War Tour

Opening act
2013: Love in the Future Tour 
2014: Black Panties Tour 
2015: The London Sessions Tour 
2015: Promise To Love Tour 
2017 : Lions And Tigers And Bears 
2017–18: The Great Xscape Tour 
2019 : Welcome To The Dungeon Tour 
2022 : R&B Music Experience

Awards and nominations

References

External links

 
1977 births
20th-century African-American  women singers
21st-century African-American  women singers
Actresses from Maryland
African-American actresses
African-American Methodists
African-American television personalities
American contemporary R&B singers
American film actresses
American sopranos
American soul singers
American television actresses
African-American television talk show hosts
American television talk show hosts
Big Brother (American TV series) winners
Big Brother (franchise) winners
The Braxtons members
Living people
Participants in American reality television series
People from Severn, Maryland
People with vitiligo
Singers from Maryland